Bremenium is an ancient Roman fort (castrum) located at Rochester, Northumberland, England. The fort is one of the defensive structures built along Dere Street, a Roman road running from York to Corbridge and onwards to Melrose. Significantly the fort is a long way north of Hadrian's Wall. It was one of the last forts north of Hadrian's wall to remain occupied until the 270s.

The fort's name, Bremenium, is mentioned in the Ravenna Cosmography, the Antonine Itinerary and Ptolemy's Geographia.

A separate Roman road ran eastwards from Bremenium to the Roman fort at Learchild, where it joined up with the Devil's Causeway Roman road to Berwick upon Tweed.

Location

It was one of the forts along Dere Street, and positioned to defend this main supply and transit route to the north.

Historical background

In 79 AD Agricola moved against the Brigantes of northern England and the Selgovae along the southern coast of Scotland, using overwhelming military power to establish Roman control. He built a network of military roads and forts to secure the Roman occupation and Bremenium was built around 80 AD. Existing forts were strengthened and new ones planted in northeastern Scotland along the Highland Line, consolidating control of the glens that provided access to and from the Scottish Highlands. The line of military communication and supply across southeastern Scotland and northeastern England was Dere Street (on which Bremenium was located) which was well-fortified.

After Agricola was recalled from Britain in 84 AD the Romans retired to a more defensible line along the Forth–Clyde isthmus. In the 120s Hadrian established the frontier further south by building his wall, and Bremeniun remained outside it as an "outpost" fort.

The emperor Antoninus Pius advanced again in the 140s and built the Antonine Wall, when Bremenium once again became 
a supply and logistical waypoint on Dere Street until about 164 when Hadrian's wall became the frontier again leaving Bremenium in hostile territory.

Description

The name Bremenium means 'The Place of the Roaring Stream'. The site is in a strong position, occupying the end of a ridge with the ground falling away steeply to the north and west, and giving a clear view over the Rede Valley and beyond.

Defensive ditches can still be seen to the north and east, outside which Dere Street passes. Early temporary marching camps at Redesdale are visible across the Sills Burn from the fort.

There was a gate in each of the four walls, which were of stone backed by a bank of earth. It appears that an early 1st-century fort with a turf rampart occupied the site, and that it was replaced by a stone fort during the time that Quintus Lollius Urbicus was Governor of Britain. He stayed there on his way north to build the Antonine Wall in 142 AD. The fort remained occupied even after the abandonment of the Antonine Wall in the early 160s.

The fort is unusual, in that it had 3rd-century artillery defences. The walls were thicker than most Roman forts and had stone platforms projecting  back from the wall, on which were placed catapult-like machines for hurling missiles. These machines, a smaller version of the ballista, were known as 'onagri', and derived their power from the torsion of a hair rope. From the north walls, these machines could fire missiles at anyone advancing down Dere Street from the north.

Garrison

In the 2nd century the garrison was the First Cohort of Lingones (part-mounted and 500 strong), and then the First Cohort of Dalmatians (infantry). In the 3rd century the garrison was the First Cohort of Vardulians (part-mounted and one thousand strong).

Current site

The fort is now part of the village green of Rochester, but there are still remains to see. The west wall is the best preserved and consists of a nine-feet-high bank with stone facing. The west gate is complete to the springing of the arch. However, much of the stonework has been plundered over the years for local buildings.

Excavations

Excavations were carried out in 1852 and 1855, but were poorly recorded. A small dig was also carried out in 1935. The excavations established that the interior of the fort was crowded with buildings, many with hypocausts.

See also

 Chew Green
 Featherwood Roman Camps

References

 
 J. Collingwood Bruce, Roman Wall (1863), Harold Hill & Son, 
 Frank Graham, The Roman Wall, Comprehensive History and Guide (1979), Frank Graham, 
 http://www.roman-britain.co.uk/places/bremenium/

External links

BREMENIVM Roman Fort and Marching Camps
Bremenium Dedication Slab
Northern Outpost

Roman fortifications in England
Roman sites in Northumberland
Rochester, Northumberland